Gravvik is a former municipality in the old Nord-Trøndelag county, Norway. The  municipality existed from 1909 until its dissolution in 1964. The municipality covered the northern coastal areas of the present-day municipality of Nærøysund in Trøndelag county. The administrative centre of the municipality was the village of Gravvik where the Gravvik Church is located.

History

The municipality of Gravvik was established on 1 January 1909 when the municipality of Leka was divided in two. The northern island area (population: 1,209) became the new (smaller) municipality of Leka and the southern coastal area (population: 881) became the municipality of Gravvik.

During the 1960s, there were many municipal mergers across Norway due to the work of the Schei Committee.  On 1 January 1964, the neighboring municipalities of Kolvereid (population: 2,426), Nærøy (population: 2,182), Gravvik (population: 816), and the western two-thirds of Foldereid were merged to form the new, larger municipality of Nærøy.

Name
The municipality (originally the parish) is named after the old Gravik farm which was named after the local Gravikvågen bay. The first element comes from the Old Norse word  which means "grave". Historically, the name was spelled Gravigen or Gravik.

Government
During its existence, this municipality was governed by a municipal council of elected representatives, which in turn elected a mayor.

Mayors
The mayors of Gravvik:

 1908–1913: Karl August Jensen (H)
 1914–1919: Martin Mortensen Skotvik 
 1920–1922: Jakob Dølør (V)
 1923–1925: Ole Wang Skotnes 
 1926–1928: Ole Dragland (Bp)
 1929–1942: Mathias K. Hagen (Bp)
 1942–1945: Arne Olsen 
 1945-1945: Jens Wang 
 1946–1947: Ingvard Hiller 
 1948–1950: Bjarne Størdal 
 1950–1951: Fredrik Gansmo 
 1952–1959: Harald Tømmervik (Bp)
 1960–1963: Edvin Aspli (Sp)

Municipal council
The municipal council  of Gravvik was made up of 13 representatives that were elected to four year terms.  The party breakdown of the final municipal council was as follows:

See also
List of former municipalities of Norway

References

Nærøysund
Nærøy
Former municipalities of Norway
1909 establishments in Norway
1964 disestablishments in Norway